Diabolic Symphony is the fifth album by the Swedish power metal band Steel Attack.

Track listing

Album line-up
Ronny Hemlin - Vocals
John Allan - Guitar
Johan Jalonen - Guitar 
Anden Andersson - Bass 
Tony Elfving - Drums

References

2006 albums
Steel Attack albums
Massacre Records albums